Isyakayevo (İśäkäy) is a rural locality (a selo) in Sukhorechensky Selsoviet, Bizhbulyaksky District, Bashkortostan, Russia. The population was 129 as of 2010. There are 4 streets.

Geography 
Isyakayevo is located 41 km west of Bizhbulyak (the district's administrative centre) by road. Shomyrtly is the nearest rural locality.

References 

Rural localities in Bizhbulyaksky District